STEGAL (Sachsen-Thüringen-Erdgas-Anbindungsleitung) is a natural gas pipeline in Saxony and Thuringia, Germany. It connects the Czech Transgas pipeline at Olbernhau and the JAGAL pipeline (exporting gas from the Yamal–Europe pipeline) at Rückersdorf with the MIDAL pipeline at Reckrod. The pipeline is used for the Russian gas import. It is operated by Wingas GmbH & Co. KG.

Construction of the STEGAL pipeline started in 1991 and the pipeline was completed in 1992. In 1999, the JAGAL pipeline was connected with STEGAL at Rückersdorf.

Due to increasing demand, the STEGAL ring line was built and put into operation in 2005/2006. This is 97 km long and runs parallel to the STEGAL sections, increasing the capacity of the line by more than 400,000 m³ / h.

See also

 NEL pipeline
 OPAL pipeline
 Rehden–Hamburg gas pipeline
 WEDAL

References

External links
 STEGAL website by Wingas

Energy infrastructure completed in 1992
Natural gas pipelines in Germany